Les matins de grands soirs is the second album by Québécois rock band Les Breastfeeders. The album was released 15 August 2006 by Blow the Fuse Records.

Track listing
 "Viens avec moi"
 "Chanson pour destinée"
 "Funny Funiculaire"
 "Tout va pour le mieux dans le pire des mondes"
 "Da-Di-Dam"
 "Et j'apprendrai que c'est l'hiver"
 "En dansant le Yah!"
 "Pas sans saveur"
 "Le roi est nu"
 "Qui a deux femmes"
 "Où allez-vous si vite?"
 "Tuer l'idole"
 "Tu n'es pas mon chien"
 "Septembre sous la pluie"

Matins
Matins
Blow The Fuse Records albums